David Bader may refer to:

 David Bader (computer scientist) (born 1969), American professor of computing
 David Bader (writer), zen and haiku writer
 David Bader (footballer) (born 1969), Swiss footballer